A congregational mosque, also known as a Friday mosque, great mosque, grand mosque, or jama masjid, is a type of mosque which is the main mosque of a certain area that hosts the special Friday noon prayers known as jumu'ah. The following is a list of congregational mosques by country or region.

Afghanistan 

 Great Mosque of Herat
 Jama Masjid of Balkh – ruins, located in Balkh, Afghanistan

Albania 

 Great Mosque of Durrës
 Great Mosque of Tirana

Algeria 

 1st November of 1954 Great Mosque
 Great Mosque of Algiers (disambiguation)
 Great Mosque of Nedroma
 Great Mosque of Tlemcen

Azerbaijan 

 Juma Mosque in Baku
 Shah Abbas' Juma Mosque in Ganja
 Juma Mosque  in Nakhchivan
 Juma Mosque in Ordubad
 Juma Mosque in Shamakhi

Bangladesh 

 Munshibari Jama Masjid in Taltoli, Comilla

Bahrain 

 Al Fateh Grand Mosque, in Manama

Belgium 

 Great Mosque of Brussels

Cameroon 

 Lamido Grand Mosque, in N'Gaoundere

Canada 

 Great Mosque of Quebec City
 Jami Mosque, Toronto

China 

 Great Mosque of Sian, Xi'an, capital of Shaanxi Province
 Jamia Mosque in Hong Kong
 Lhasa Great Mosque
 Taizi Great Mosque
 Tongxin Great Mosque

Dagestan (Republic of Dagestan) 

 Grand Mosque of Makhachkala

Denmark 

 Grand Mosque of Copenhagen

Egypt 

 Mosque of Amr ibn al-As
 Ibn Tulun Mosque
 Al-Azhar Mosque
 Al-Nasir Muhammad Mosque

Eritrea 

 Great Mosque of Asmara

Ethiopia 

 Jamia Mosque, Harar

France 

 Grand Mosque of Évry, Paris
 Grand Mosque of Paris

Guinea 

 Grand Mosque of Conakry

Kuwait 
 Grand Mosque of Kuwait, Kuwait City

India

Andhra Pradesh 

 Shahi Jamia Mosque in Adoni

Delhi 

 Jama Masjid in old Delhi
 Shia Jama Masjid in old  Delhi

Gujarat 

 Jama Masjid in Ahmedabad
 Jama Mosque in Champaner

Himachal Pradesh 

 Jama Masjid in Dharamshala

Jammu and Kashmir 

 Jamia Masjid in Srinagar

Karnataka 

 Masjid Zeenath Baksh in Mangalore
 Jama Masjid Gulbarga in Gulbarga
 Jama Masjid in Bijapur

Kerala 

 Cheraman Juma Mosque in Kodungallur
 Juma Masjid in Pullancheri
 Palayam Juma Masjid in Thiruvananthapuram (Trivandrum)
 Thazhathangady Juma Masjid in Kottayam

Madhya Pradesh 

 Jama Masjid in Mandu

Maharashtra 

 Jama Masjid in Aurangabad
 Jama Masjid in Erandol
 Jama Masjid in Mumbai
 Jama Masjid in Mominpura, Nagpur
 Jama Mosque in Furus, Ratnagiri district]

Tamil Nadu 

 Kazimar Big Mosque in Madurai
 Goripalayam Mosque in Madurai
 Sungam Mosque in Madurai
 Palaiya Jumma Palli in Kilakarai
 Athar Jamad Masjid in Coimbatore
 Kottaimedu Mosque in Coimbatore

Telangana 

 Makkah Masjid in Hyderabad

Uttar Pradesh 

 Great Mosque, Budaun
 Jama Masjid in Agra
 Jama Masjid in Fatehpur Sikri
 Jama Masjid in Jaunpur
 Jama Masjid in Lucknow
 Jama Masjid in Mathura

West Bengal 
 Jama Masjid, Motijheel, in Murshidabad

Indonesia 

 Al-Akbar Mosque in Surabaya, East Java
 Al-Azhar Great Mosque, Jakarta
 Al-Markaz Al-Islami Mosque in Makassar, South Sulawesi
 An-Nur Great Mosque Pekanbaru in Riau
 Baiturrahman Grand Mosque in Banda Aceh, Aceh
 Darussalam Great Mosque, Samarinda
 Darussalam Great Mosque, West Sumbawa
 Demak Great Mosque, Central Java
 Ganting Grand Mosque, Padang, West Sumatra
 Grand Mosque of Bandung, Indonesia
 Grand Mosque of the Sultan of Riau, in Tanjung Pinang, Bintan island
 Grand Mosque of West Sumatra, in Ganting, Padang
 Great Mosque of Banten
 Great Mosque of Cirebon
 Great Mosque of Central Java
 Great Mosque of Medan
 Great Mosque of Sumenep
 Great Mosque of Surakarta
 Great Mosque of Makassar
 Great Mosque of Malang
 Great Mosque of Palembang,
 Great Mosque of Surabaya, Al-Akbar Mosque, East Java
 Great Mosque of Riyadusshalihin
 Istiqlal Mosque in Jakarta, West Java
 Kauman Great Mosque Java
 Nurul Islam Great Mosque
 Samarinda Islamic Center Mosque in East Kalimantan

Iran 

 Jameh Mosque of Abarkuh
 Jameh Mosque of Ahar
 Jameh Mosque of Amol
 Jameh Mosque of Aradan
 Jameh Mosque of Ardakan
 Jameh Mosque of Ardestan
 Jameh Mosque of Arak
 Jameh Mosque of Arsanjan
 Jameh Mosque of Ashtarjan
 Jameh Mosque of Atigh
 Jameh Mosque of Babol
 Jameh Mosque of Bandar Abbas
 Jameh Mosque of Bastak
 Jameh Mosque of Borujerd
 Jameh Mosque of Damavand
 Jameh Mosque of Damghan
 Jameh Mosque of Darab
 Jameh Mosque of Dezful
 Jameh Mosque of Eslamiyeh
 Jameh Mosque of Fahraj
 Jameh Mosque of Fathabad
 Jameh Mosque of Ferdows
 Jameh Mosque of Farumad
 Jameh Mosque of Germi
 Jameh Mosque of Golpayegan
 Jameh Mosque of Gonabad
 Jameh Mosque of Gorgan
 Jameh Mosque of Gugan
 Jameh Mosque of Hamadan
 Jameh Mosque of Isfahan
 Jameh Mosque of Jahrom
 Jameh Mosque of Jajarm
 Jameh Mosque of Kabir Neyriz
 Jameh Mosque of Kashmar
 Jameh Mosque of Kerman
 Jameh Mosque of Kermanshah
 Jameh Mosque of Khansar
 Jameh Mosque of Khozan
 Jameh Mosque of Lar
 Jameh Mosque of Makki
 Jameh Mosque of Mehrabad
 Jameh Mosque of Marand
 Jameh Mosque of Marandiz
 Jameh Mosque of Nain
 Jameh Mosque of Namin
 Jameh Mosque of Natanz
 Jameh Mosque of Nishapur
 Jameh Mosque of Nushabad
 Jameh Mosque of Pachian
 Jameh Mosque of Qazvin
 Jameh Mosque of Qerveh
 Jameh Mosque of Qeshm
 Jameh Mosque of Qiblah
 Jameh Mosque of Qom
 Jameh Mosque of Radkan
 Jameh Mosque of Raqqeh
 Jameh Mosque of Sabzevar
 Jameh Mosque of Sarab
 Jameh Mosque of Sarabi
 Jameh Mosque of Sari
 Jameh Mosque of Sanandaj
 Jameh Mosque of Saveh
 Jameh Mosque of Semnan
 Jameh Mosque of Shafi‘i
 Jameh Mosque of Shahrud
 Jameh Mosque of Shushtar
 Jameh Mosque of Sojas
 Jameh Mosque of Tabriz
 Jameh Mosque of Takab
 Jameh Mosque of Tehran
 Jameh Mosque of Urmia
 Jameh Mosque of Varamin
 Jameh Mosque of Yazd
 Jameh Mosque of Zanjan
 Jameh Mosque of Zavareh

Iraq 

 Great Mosque of al-Mansur
 Great Mosque of Kufa
 Great Mosque, Aqrah
 Great Mosque of Samarra
 Great Mosque of al-Nuri, Mosul
 Great Mosque of Amadiya

Kenya 

 Jamia Mosque in Kenya

Lebanon 

 Al-Omari Grand Mosque, in Beirut
 Mansouri Great Mosque

Malaysia 

 Masjid Jamek in Kuala Lumpur
 National Mosque of Malaysia in Kuala Lumpur

Maldives 

 Malé Hukuru Miskyii in Malé

Mali 

 Grand Mosque of Bamako
 Great Mosque of Djenné
 Grand Mosque of Mopti
 Great Mosque of Niono Ségou Region, southern Mali

Mauritania 

 Friday Mosque of Nouakchott

Mongolia 

 Great Mosque of Hohhot

Morocco 

 Al-Qarawiyyin Mosque
Grand Mosque of Chefchaouen
 Great Mosque of Fes el-Jdid
 Grand Mosque of Oujda
 Great Mosque, Rabat
 Great Mosque of Salé
 Grand Mosque of Tangier
 Great Mosque of Taza
Mosque of the Andalusians

Niger 

 Grand Mosque of Niamey

Nigeria 

 Abuja National Mosque in Abuja, FCT
 Great Mosque of Kano
 Lagos Central Mosque in Lagos, Lagos State

Oman 

 Sultan Qaboos Grand Mosque, in the Sultanate of Oman

Pakistan 

 Badshahi Masjid in Lahore, Punjab
 Grand Jamia Mosque, Karachi
 Grand Jamia Mosque, Lahore
 Grand Mosque Allahabad, in Kandiaro, Sindh
 Jamia Masjid in Sialkot, Punjab
 Jamia Mosque in Khudabad, Sindh
 Shah Jahan Mosque in Thatta, Sindh

Palestinian territories 

 Great Mosque of Gaza

 Great Mosque of Jenin, the Fatima Khatun Mosque
 Great Mosque of Nablus, West Bank

Russia 

 Akhmad Kadyrov Mosque in Grozny
 Grand Mosque in Makhachkala
 Moscow Cathedral Mosque
 Kul Sharif Mosque, Kazan
 Saint Petersburg Mosque

Saudi Arabia 

 Great Mosque of Mecca, also known as Masjid al-Haram: the location of the Kaaba and the main site of the Hajj pilgrimage

Senegal 

 Grand Mosque of Dakar
 Great Mosque of Touba

Somalia 

 Jama'a Xamar Weyne in Mogadishu
 Jama'a Shingani in Mogadishu

Somaliland 

 Jama Mosque in Hargeisa

South Africa 

 Juma Mosque in Durban

Spain 

 Great Mosque of Córdoba, the Mosque–Cathedral of Córdoba
 Great Mosque of Seville, now Seville Cathedral

Sri Lanka 

 Grand Mosque of Colombo

Syria 

 Great Mosque of Aleppo
 Great Mosque of al-Nuri, Homs
 Great Mosque of Damascus, aka the Umayyad Mosque
 Great Mosque of Hama
 Great Mosque of Maarrat al-Numan
 Great Mosque of Raqqa

Taiwan 

 Taipei Grand Mosque, in Taipei

Tanzania 

 Great Mosque of Kilwa Kisiwani

Turkey 

 Divriği Great Mosque and Hospital
 Great Mosque of Adana
 Grand Mosque of Bursa
 Great Mosque of Diyarbakır
 Grand Mosque of Mersin
 Grand Mosque of Tarsus
 Grand Mosque of Uşak
 Kocatepe Mosque, Ankara
 Sultan Ahmed Mosque, Istanbul

Tunisia 

 Great Mosque of Kairouan, Tunisia
 Great Mosque of Mahdiya, Tunisia
 Great Mosque of Monastir, Tunisia
 Great Mosque of Sfax, Tunisia
 Great Mosque of Sousse, Tunisia
 Great Mosque of Testour, Tunisia

Ukraine 

 Ahat Jami Mosque in Donetsk
 Juma-Jami Mosque in Yevpatoria

United Arab Emirates 
Grand Mosque in Dubai, United Arab Emirates

United Kingdom 

 Jami Masjid and Islamic Centre in Birmingham, West Midlands
 Jaame Masjid in Blackburn, Lancashire
 Jamea Masjid in Preston, Lancashire
 Leeds Grand Mosque, in Leeds, England
 London Great Mosque, now the Brick Lane Mosque
 North Manchester Jamia Mosque in Greater Manchester

Uzbekistan 

 Dzhuma Mosque

Yemen 

 Great Mosque of Sanaa, Yemen
 Great Mosque of Zabid, Yemen, al-Asha'ir Mosque

References 

Congregational